Douglas Rowe (born 1938) is an American actor.

Career
Rowe is mostly a character and supporting actor, he has appeared in films such as The Incident (1990) and Appointment with Fear (1985), his character as the off-beat, seedy looking detective in Appointment with Fear was described as a "maniac detective inspired by Dirty Harry.". On television he appeared in the Star Trek: The Next Generation, episode "The Outrageous Okona."  In the 1990s he appeared as a Proprietor in Murder She Wrote, portrayed Dr. Arndt in ER and Ricky in Northern Exposure' and pilot Aylesworth in  M*A*S*H”'.

Theater
Rowe was managing director of the Laguna Playhouse from 1964 to 1966, and served as artistic director from 1976 to 1991. Rowe is also a prolific stage actor, starring in productions of Death of a Salesman, Caesar and Cleopatra, Our Town and As You Like It''.

References

External links

American male television actors
1930s births
Living people